The Nova Scotia Health Authority is a provincial health authority serving Nova Scotia, Canada. It is the largest employer in the province, with more than 23,000 employees, 2,500 physicians and 7,000 volunteers working from 45 different facilities. Its largest hospital is the QEII Health Sciences Centre in Halifax.

Facilities 
The Nova Scotia Health authority operates various facilities across the province of Nova Scotia:

Aberdeen Hospital
All Saints Springhill Hospital
Cape Breton Regional Hospital
Dartmouth General Hospital
Colchester East Hants Hospital
Cumberland County Hospital
Digby General Hospital
Hants Community Hospital
Queen Elizabeth II Health Sciences Centre
South Shore Regional Hospital
St. Martha's Regional Hospital
Twin Oaks Memorial Hospital
Yarmouth Regional Hospital

History 
The Nova Scotia Health Authority was formed on April 1, 2015 as an amalgamation of nine existing regional authorities:

 South Shore District Health Authority
 South West District Health Authority
 Annapolis Valley District Health Authority
 Colchester East Hants Health Authority
 Cumberland Health Authority
 Pictou County Health Authority
 Guysborough Antigonish Strait Health Authority
 Cape Breton District Health Authority
 Capital District Health Authority

The authority received a $843,530 grant from the Public Health Agency of Canada's Immunization Partnership Fund to implement Nova Scotia's Enhanced Immunization Access Project. Between December 2019 and May 2020, parents of children born in 2011 were surveyed to collect up-to-date immunization records.

On September 1st, 2021, the newly elected provincial government undertook wholesale changes in the NS Health Authority. The CEO and volunteer board members were released from their duties. An interim CEO was appointed. Karen Oldfield, newly appointed interim CEO, previously was the senior executive at the Halifax Ports Corporation.

References

External links 
 

Health regions of Nova Scotia